Teresa Portela may refer to:

 Teresa Portela (Portuguese canoeist) (born 1987)
 Teresa Portela (Spanish canoeist) (born 1982)